Xylopia nigricans is a species of plant in the Annonaceae family. It is endemic to the understory in Sri Lanka. It is known as heen kenda (හීන් කෙන්ද) in Sinhala. It is widely used as a medicinal plant in Sri Lanka.

References

External links
 http://jnsfsl.sljol.info/article/abstract/10.4038/jnsfsr.v38i1.1728/
 http://www.theplantlist.org/tpl1.1/record/kew-2468153

Flora of Sri Lanka
nigricans